In the 2006 Campionati Internazionali di Sicilia singles event, Igor Andreev was the defending champion, but did not participate.

Filippo Volandri won the title, defeating Nicolás Lapentti 5–7, 6–1, 6–3 in the final.

Seeds

Draw

Finals

Top half

Bottom half

References

External links
Main draw
Qualifying draw

Campionati Internazionali di Sicilia
2006 ATP Tour
Camp